Kenneth Lee Wallace (born August 23, 1963) is an American race car driver and former reporter for Fox NASCAR. He retired from NASCAR in 2015 after driving in the national series since 1988. In a career spanning 25 years in NASCAR, Wallace had nine wins, all occurring in the NASCAR Xfinity Series. Now retired from NASCAR competition, he continues to race on local dirt tracks across the country as a hobby.

Early life
Wallace is the youngest of three brothers born to Russ and Judy Wallace. Russ was a prolific race winner himself, which made him unpopular with fans. Wallace earned his nickname, "Herman," early in life when Lake Hill Speedway promoter Bob Mueller made note of Wallace's boisterous behavior when taking up for his father, likening him to the mischievous cartoon character Herman the German. He went to Fox High School in Arnold, MO.

Wallace began his racing career by working as a mechanic on his father's race cars and brother's team. He entered his first race, the Illinois Street Stock State Championship, in 1982, winning the event. In 1984, Wallace worked as a mechanic for Benfield Racing and Joe Ruttman, eventually being promoted to crew chief after Jake Elder left the team. He entered the American Speed Association in 1986, achieving Rookie of the Year honors in the series.

Early Busch career
In September 1988, Dale Earnhardt gave Wallace the seat for his first-ever NASCAR start, in which he finished eleventh in the Busch Series race at Martinsville Speedway, driving the No. 8 GM Goodwrench Chevrolet. The following year, he raced the full Busch Series schedule in a car owned by brother Rusty Wallace, sponsored by Cox Treated Lumber earning the 1989 Rookie of the Year award and finishing sixth in driver point standings.  In 1990, he made his Winston Cup debut at North Wilkesboro Speedway in the No. 36 Pontiac for Randy Cox, finishing 26th after a late-race crash, setting up the controversial finish, which saw Brett Bodine win. He finished seventh in the Busch Series. The following season, he won his first two career races at Volusia County and New Hampshire, and finished a career-best second in the Busch points. He also subbed for Kyle Petty in two races in the Cup series at Charlotte and Dover. At the Pyroil 500, he competed against his brothers Mike and Rusty, marking the first time since Bob, Fonty, and Tim Flock raced that three brothers competed in the same race. In 1992, Dirt Devil became his sponsor and he won his third career Busch race at Martinsville, but several mechanical problems forced him down to sixth in points.

1993–2000
In 1993, Wallace moved up to the Winston Cup Series full-time, driving the No. 40 Dirt Devil-sponsored Pontiac Grand Prix for SABCO Racing. The team got a considerable amount of television time as the team was featured on the TV show What Would You Do?. He had three Top 10's and  finished 23rd in points, but lost his ride at the end of the season. He returned to the Busch Series to drive the No. 8 TIC Financial Systems-sponsored Ford for FILMAR Racing. He picked up three wins and finished fourth in points. Towards the end of the season, he was hired by Robert Yates Racing to replace an injured Ernie Irvan in the Cup series. In 12 races, he finished in the Top 10 three times. In 1995, Wallace and FILMAR split time between the Cup and Busch Series. Wallace had one win with the Red Dog Ford in the Busch Series at Richmond, and made eleven starts in the Cup Series in the No. 81 car.

Wallace and FILMAR began racing in Cup full-time 1996 with funding from Square D. They had two top-ten finishes and finished 28th in points. The following season, he won two poles, at Bristol and Martinsville respectively, but fell five spots in the standings. Despite seven Top 10's in 1998, Wallace and Square D left FILMAR to drive Andy Petree Racing's new No. 55 entry. Wallace finished in the top-ten five times and had a career-best twenty-second-place finish in points. After only one Top 10 in 2000 and a 26th-place finish in the points, he departed the team. The sole Top 10 came in his second-place finish to Dale Earnhardt in the 2000 Winston 500, which was Earnhardt's 76th and final victory. Wallace pushed Earnhardt to the front in four laps to the lead.

2001–2015

In 2001, Wallace signed with the unsponsored Eel River Racing team, and also was hired to drive the No. 48 Goulds Pumps-sponsored Chevy in the Busch Series full-time for Innovative Motorsports. After several DNQ's, Wallace resigned from the team to concentrate on his Busch ride. He won his first race in seven years at North Carolina Speedway and finished tenth in points. He also filled in for Steve Park in the Cup Series, winning one pole and nailing down two top tens, including a second-place finish at Rockingham Speedway, tying a career best. He did not win in 2002, but moved up to seventh in the Busch series standings in the No. 48 Chevrolet now sponsored by Stacker 2. He replaced Kevin Harvick in Richard Childress Racing's No. 29 car at Martinsville after the latter was suspended for deliberately wrecking another driver in the Truck Series race the day before. He was hired late in the season by Bill Davis Racing to replace Hut Stricklin in the No. 23 Hills Brothers Coffee-sponsored Dodge, and was hired to drive the car full-time in 2003, bringing his Stacker 2 sponsorship with him and continuing to drive in the Busch Series for Davis. After one top ten finish, Wallace and the team moved down to the Busch Series in 2004, garnering ten top tens. He also drove in the Cup Series five times for Michael Waltrip Racing.

In 2005, Davis Racing closed its Busch team, allowing Wallace and sponsor Stacker 2 to join ppc Racing's No. 22 Ford, earning five Top fives and eleven top tens. During that season Wallace's team lost sponsorship when Stacker 2 backed out of NASCAR, and drove for the rest of his time with ppc Racing driving the No. 22 AutoZone-sponsored Ford. He began driving for Furniture Row Racing in the Cup Series that season, and ran seventeen races with them in 2006. After four top tens in 2006, Furniture Row began racing full-time in Cup, so Wallace left ppc.

Despite getting voted into the All-Star Race at Charlotte, Wallace was unable to keep the No. 78 in the top 35 in owner's points, and left the team in August. On August 22, 2007, he filled in for Kyle Petty in the No. 45 Wells Fargo-sponsored Dodge at Bristol. Shortly after that drove as a sub for an injured Ricky Rudd in the No. 88 Snickers-sponsored Ford Fusion until Rudd returned.

Wallace attempted to qualify for the 2008 Daytona 500 in a second car for Furniture Row Racing—the No. 87 Denver Mattress-sponsored Chevrolet. This car was entered as a safety net for the team's primary driver Joe Nemechek in the 78, should his car not make the race. Nemechek locked the 78 in on pole day, giving Wallace the opportunity to race. Wallace finished eighth in the first Duel at Daytona, making the 50th Daytona 500. Wallace was black flagged in the 500 for failure to maintain the NASCAR-required speed, allowing him to finished dead-last. Wallace drove for Armando Fitz early in the 2008 NASCAR Nationwide Series season before switching to the No. 28 for Jay Robinson. Between the 2008, 2009, and 2010 seasons, Wallace finished in the top ten three times. He left Jay Robinson and joined RAB Racing, driving without a paycheck in exchange for getting to drive competitive equipment. Wallace recorded eleven top ten finishes in 2011, with a best finish of fifth at Richmond. In October, he announced that he would return to the team in 2012. However, Wallace only ran the first five races before sponsorship issues forced him to move to a partial schedule. In addition to driving both RAB's Nos. 09 and 99, Wallace also drove at Indianapolis with Benny Gordon's SR2 Motorsports team and finished 19th.

In January 2012, RAB Racing announced that Wallace would be attempting to qualify for the 2012 Daytona 500, driving the American Ethanol-sponsored No. 09 Toyota Camry. The team suffered fuel pump issues in the Gatorade Duel and failed to qualify for the race.

In July 2012, Wallace was guaranteed a ride for one race in the No. 22 Penske Racing Nationwide car, but Sam Hornish Jr. was given the ride.

In 2013, Wallace ran the inaugural Mudsummer Classic at Eldora Speedway and after winning the fourth heat race, he finished seventeenth after starting fourth in the event. He also ran at Chicagoland Speedway in the Truck Series, as well as running a limited schedule in the Nationwide Series for RAB Racing; at the Chicagoland Nationwide race, he made his 900th start in NASCAR's top three divisions. In late September, he qualified Brian Vickers' Sprint Cup Series car at New Hampshire Motor Speedway, due to a scheduling conflict; Vickers drove in the race and finished 7th.

In early 2015, Wallace competed in the Chili Bowl Midget Nationals for Loyet Motorsports. Also in 2015, Kenny's brother, Mike Wallace, had open heart surgery. Kenny was announced as his replacement in the Winn-Dixie 300 at Talladega, driving the No. 26 Xfinity Series Toyota for JGL Racing. Wallace was involved in a late-race accident and finished 38th. He joined RAB Racing for the Iowa race in June with the sponsorship from U.S. Cellular, finishing a respectable 23rd after starting from the rear of the field. He also announced that he would run his final NASCAR race at Iowa with Joe Gibbs Racing in August. He finished fifteenth in his final NASCAR start.

2016–present
Though his NASCAR driving career came to an end, he continues to race on dirt tracks in his UMPDirtCar modified. In August, he ran the Stadium Super Trucks race at the Charlotte Dirt Track, driving the No. 36 Safecraft Safety Equipment truck. He finished eighth in the event.

Personal life
Wallace is a member of a large racing family. Wallace's father, Russ, was a prolific winner on Midwestern short tracks in the 1960s and 1970s. Kenny and his older brothers, Rusty Wallace and Mike Wallace, followed in their father's footsteps. Rusty is the 1989 NASCAR Winston Cup Series champion and winner of 55 Cup Series races. Mike is a winner of four Nationwide Series and five Camping World Truck Series races. Rusty's son, Steve Wallace, is a former Nationwide Series driver, and Mike's daughter, Chrissy Wallace, has participated in multiple Nationwide Series and Camping World Truck Series races.

Living outside of St. Louis, Missouri, Wallace is married to Kim and has three daughters, Brooke, Brandy, and Brittany. He became a grandfather on May 19, 2016

During his early Cup days, Wallace had a go-kart track in his backyard that hosted races for other Cup drivers. The track was eventually razed when Wallace didn't have insurance to cover injuries sustained at the track.

Images

Motorsports career results

NASCAR
(key) (Bold – Pole position awarded by qualifying time. Italics – Pole position earned by points standings or practice time. * – Most laps led.)

Cup Series

Daytona 500

Xfinity Series

Camping World Truck Series

 Season still in progress
 Ineligible for series points

References

External links

 
 
 Kenny Wallace at NASCAR.com

Living people
1963 births
Sportspeople from St. Louis
Racing drivers from Missouri
Racing drivers from St. Louis
24 Hours of Daytona drivers
NASCAR crew chiefs
NASCAR drivers
Stadium Super Trucks drivers
American Speed Association drivers
Wallace family
Fox Sports 1 people
Dale Earnhardt Inc. drivers
Michael Waltrip Racing drivers
Robert Yates Racing drivers
Richard Childress Racing drivers
Joe Gibbs Racing drivers
ARCA Midwest Tour drivers
RFK Racing drivers
Team Penske drivers